George James McLeod (30 November 1932 – 5 September 2016) was a Scottish professional footballer who played as a winger in the Football League for Luton Town, Brentford and Queens Park Rangers.

Playing career

Early years 
Born in Inverness and brought up in Brora, McLeod began his career with Highland League clubs Brora Rangers and Clachnacuddin. Despite a lack of success in the league, he won the first silverware of his career in cup competitions with Clachnacuddin. He departed the club in early 1955.

Luton Town 
McLeod moved to England to sign for Second Division high-flyers Luton Town in January 1955. He failed to make an immediate impact and made just one appearance in what remained of the 1954–55 season, in which the Hatters finished second in the Second Division to claim a place in the top-flight for the first time in the club's history. McLeod made 15 appearances and scored his first goal for the club during the 1955–56 season, before establishing himself in the team during 1957–58, making 35 appearances and scoring four goals. He made just one appearance during the early weeks of the 1958–59 season, before departing the club in October 1958. McLeod made 54 appearances and scored five goals during his time at Kenilworth Road.

Brentford 
McLeod dropped down to Third Division to join Brentford for a £6,000 fee in October 1958. He quickly went on to establish himself in the team and was rarely absent, including chalking up a run of 132 consecutive appearances, which included a career-high 52 games during the 1961–62 season. McLeod was an ever-present during the 1962–63 Fourth Division championship-winning season, making 49 appearances as Brentford were promoted back to the Third Division at the first attempt. McLeod fell out of favour during the 1963–64 season, departing Griffin Park in January 1964. McLeod made 232 appearances and scored 22 goals during his six years with the Bees.

Queens Park Rangers 
McLeod signed for Brentford's Third Division West London rivals Queens Park Rangers in January 1964, in a part exchange deal which saw Mark Lazarus move to Brentford for an £8,000 fee. He made 42 appearances and scored four goals before departing at the end of the 1964–65 season.

Port Elizabeth City 
McLeod ended his career with a spell in South Africa at National Football League club Port Elizabeth City, playing under former Brentford teammate Matt Crowe.

Personal life 
McLeod, a widower, died on 5 September 2016 at the age of 83; he was survived by one daughter and four brothers. Two of his relatives also became footballers – Alisdair Sutherland and John McLeod (Buckie Thistle). After his retirement from football, McLeod became a publican in Steppingley and Wootton. After his death his ashes were scattered in the River Brora.

Honours 
Clachnacuddin
 North of Scotland Cup: 1953–54
 Inverness Cup: 1952–53
Brentford
Football League Third Division: 1962–63

Career statistics

References

1932 births
Scottish footballers
Brentford F.C. players
English Football League players
Clachnacuddin F.C. players
Luton Town F.C. players
Queens Park Rangers F.C. players
National Football League (South Africa) players
Association football wingers
Scottish expatriate footballers
Scottish expatriate sportspeople in South Africa
2016 deaths
Footballers from Inverness
Brora Rangers F.C. players
People from Brora
Highland Football League players